Marita Liabø (born 26 July 1971) is a Norwegian author from Førde.

She made her debut in 1999 with the novel Tempus Fugit. Brytning followed in 2000, then Han liker meg in 2001, Mafia in 2004, Under brua in 2006 and Hoppe naken in 2007. The children's book Vida Vagabond blir haimat came in 2009.

In her writings, she switches between the nynorsk and bokmål language forms.

References

1971 births
Living people
20th-century Norwegian novelists
21st-century Norwegian novelists
Norwegian children's writers
People from Førde
Norwegian women novelists
Norwegian women children's writers
21st-century Norwegian women writers
20th-century Norwegian women writers